Xylophanes rothschildi is a moth of the  family Sphingidae. It is found from Colombia, Ecuador and Peru south to Bolivia.

The wingspan is 63–72 mm. The upperside of the forewings is dark green with a bluish glow. The base of the wings is also green, but has a deeper colour. The upperside of the hindwings is nearly black with an inconspicuous pinkish-orange median band.

The larvae probably feed on Rubiaceae and Malvaceae species.

References

rothschildi
Moths described in 1895